Frederick George Merritt (10 December 1890 – 27 September 1977) was an English theatre, film and television actor, often in authoritarian roles. He studied German theatre in Magdeburg, Germany, and taught at the Berlitz School at the outbreak of the First World War, when he was held as a British Civil Prisoner of War, and interned at Ruhleben, 1914–1918. He was involved in over 50 plays at Ruhleben. He lived for many years in Lissenden Gardens, Parliament Hill, north west London.

Selected filmography

 The W Plan (1930) – Ulrich Muller
 Bracelets (1931) – Director
 Dreyfus (1931) – Émile Zola
 A Gentleman of Paris (1931) – M. Duval
 White Face (1932) – (uncredited)
 The Lodger (1932) – Commissioner
 Blind Spot (1932) – Inspector Cadbury
 Money for Speed (1933)
 Going Straight (1933)
 F.P.1 (1933) – Lubin
 I Was a Spy (1933) – Captain Reichman
 Crime on the Hill (1933) – Police Inspector Wolf
 Turkey Time (1933) – Policeman (uncredited)
 The Silver Spoon (1933) – Inspector Innes
 The Ghost Camera (1933) – Detective
 Mr. Quincey of Monte Carlo (1933) – Inspector
 Little Fella (1933) – Detective
 The Fire Raisers (1933) – Sonners
 Nine Forty-Five (1934) – Inspector Dickson
 No Escape (1934) – Inspector Matheson
 My Song for You (1934) – Otto Newberg
 Jew Süss (1934) – Bilfinger (uncredited)
 Ten Minute Alibi (1935) – Inspector Pember
 Emil and the Detectives (1935) – PC
 Drake of England (1935) – Tom Moore
 Me and Marlborough (1935) – Harley
 Crime Unlimited (1935) – Detective Inspector Cardby
 Brown on Resolution (1935) – William Brown
 Line Engaged (1935) – Sgt. Thomas
 Mr. Cohen Takes a Walk (1935) – Pat O'Connor
 Ticket of Leave (1936) – Inspector Black
 Prison Breaker (1936) – Goldring
 Love at Sea (1936) – Inspector (uncredited)
 Love in Exile (1936) – Capt. Mackenzie (uncredited)
 Everything Is Thunder (1936) – Webber
 The Man Behind the Mask (1936) – Det. Insp. Mallory
 Spy of Napoleon (1936) – The Prussian Consul
 Dusty Ermine (1936) – Police Constable (uncredited)
 Educated Evans (1936) – Joe Markham
 Rembrandt (1936) – Church Warden (uncredited)
 Windbag the Sailor (1936) – Officer on Yacht (uncredited)
 The Vulture (1937) – Spicer
 The Compulsory Wife (1937) – Mr. Thackery
 The Wife of General Ling (1937) – Police Commissioner
 The Vicar of Bray (1937) – Oliver Cromwell (uncredited)
 Doctor Syn (1937) – Mipps the Coffin Maker
 The Return of the Scarlet Pimpernel (1937) – Chief of Police
 Rhythm Racketeer (1937) – Inspector Hunt (uncredited)
 The Rat (1937) – Pierre Verdier
 Young and Innocent (1937) – Det. Sgt. Miller
 Mr. Reeder in Room 13 (1937) – Bert Stevens, club porter
 Convict 99 (1938) – Policeman Outside Bank (uncredited)
 No Parking (1938) – (uncredited)
 The Gaunt Stranger (1938) – Police Station Sergeant
 They Drive by Night (1938) – Detective (uncredited)
 Q Planes (1939) – Barrett
 Wanted by Scotland Yard (1939) – Charlie
 The Four Just Men (1939) – Inspector Falmouth
 Young Man's Fancy (1939) – Park Constable (uncredited)
 All at Sea (1940) – Bull
 Meet Maxwell Archer (1940) – Insp. Cornell
 They Came by Night (1940) – Inspector Metcalfe
 The Proud Valley (1940) – Mr. Lewis
 A Window in London (1940) – Manager
 The Case of the Frightened Lady (1940) – Det. Inspector Tanner
 Two for Danger (1940) – Inspector Canway
 Spare a Copper (1940) – Brewster
 Gasbags (1941) – German General (uncredited)
 The Ghost Train (1941) – Inspector (uncredited)
 He Found a Star (1941) – Max Nagel
 Ships with Wings (1941) – Surgeon Comdr.
 The Black Sheep of Whitehall (1942) – Station Master
 The Big Blockade (1942) – German: German Shelter Marshal
 Hatter's Castle (1942) – Gibson
 Back-Room Boy (1942) – Uncle
 Breach of Promise (1942) – Professor Beaver
 The Day Will Dawn (1942) – German Trawler Captain
 They Flew Alone (1942) – Reporter
 Let the People Sing (1942) – Police Sergeant
 Alibi (1942) – Bourdille
 We'll Smile Again (1942) – (uncredited)
 Women Aren't Angels (1943) – Boxer (uncredited)
 Variety Jubilee (1943) – Music Hall chairman (uncredited)
 Undercover (1943) – A Yugoslav General
 I'll Walk Beside You (1943) – Hancock
 The Adventures of Tartu (1943) – Agent (uncredited)
 Escape to Danger (1943) – Works Manager
 A Canterbury Tale (1944) – Ned Horton
 The Way Ahead (1944) – The Sergeant-Major (uncredited)
 Demobbed (1944) – James Bentley
 Give Us the Moon (1944)
 Love Story (1944) – Telephone Engineer
 Don't Take It to Heart (1944) – Landlord
 Waterloo Road (1945) – Air Raid Warden
 For You Alone (1945) – Police Constable Blundell
 I'll Be Your Sweetheart (1945) – T.P. O'Connor
 Don Chicago (1945)
 Home Sweet Home (1945) – Dr. Handy
 The Voice Within (1946) – McDonnell
 Quiet Weekend (1946) – Police Sergeant
 I'll Turn to You (1946) –  Cecil Joy
 The Root of All Evil (1947) – Landlord
 The Man Within (1947) – Hilliard
 The Upturned Glass (1947) – Policeman (uncredited)
 Daughter of Darkness (1948) – Constable
 Escape (1948) – Chief Prison Guard (uncredited)
 Good-Time Girl (1948) – Police Sergeant
 Calling Paul Temple (1948) – Ticket Inspector
 My Brother's Keeper (1948) – Constable at Milton Wells
 Love in Waiting (1948) – James Hartley Pepperfield
 Quartet (1948) – Prison Officer
 For Them That Trespass (1949) - Engine Driver
 Marry Me! (1949) – Gazette Editor (uncredited)
 Dark Secret (1949) - Mr. Barrington
 Something in the City (1950) – Inspector
 Mister Drake's Duck (1951) – Home Secretary
 Pool of London (1951) – Captain of Dunbar (uncredited)
 Noose for a Lady (1953) – Sergeant Frost
 Small Town Story (1953) – Michael Collins
 The End of the Road (1954) – Timekeeper
 The Green Scarf (1954) – Advocate General
 Delayed Action (1954) - Sir Francis - (uncredited)
 Souls in Conflict - (1954) - Reverend Alan Woodbridge - (uncredited)
 Before I Wake - (1955) -  Dr. Collingwood
 Quatermass 2 (1957) – Super
 Dracula (1958) – Policeman
 Tread Softly Stranger (1958) – Timekeeper
 The Full Treatment (1960) – Mr. Manfield
 The Hands of Orlac (1960) – 2nd Member (uncredited)
 The Day the Earth Caught Fire (1961) – Smudge (uncredited)
 Crooks and Coronets (1969) – 1st Old Man (uncredited)
 Battle of Britain (1969) – Civilian (uncredited)
 Cromwell (1970) – William
 I, Monster (1971) – Poole
 Gawain and the Green Knight (1973) – Old Knight

Selected stage appearances
 Grand Hotel by Edward Knoblock (1931)
 Party Manners by Val Gielgud (1950)

References

External links

1890 births
1977 deaths
English male film actors
English male silent film actors
Male actors from London
20th-century English male actors
World War I civilian detainees held by Germany
British World War I prisoners of war